The 17th season of Taniec z gwiazdami, the Polish edition of Dancing With the Stars, started on 11 September 2015. This is the fourth season aired on Polsat.
Krzysztof Ibisz and Anna Głogowska returned as hosts and Beata Tyszkiewicz, Iwona Pavlović, Michał Malitowski and Andrzej Grabowski returned as judges.

On 13 November, Ewelina Lisowska and her partner Tomasz Barański were crowned the champions.

Couples

Scores

Red numbers indicate the lowest score for each week.
Green numbers indicate the highest score for each week.
 indicates the couple eliminated that week.
 indicates the returning couple that finished in the bottom two.
 this couple withdrew from the competition.
 this couple was eliminated but later returned to the competition.
 indicates the couple saved from elimination by immunity.
 indicates the winning couple.
 indicates the runner-up.
 indicates the couple in third place.

Average score chart 
This table only counts for dances scored on a traditional 40-points scale.

Highest and lowest scoring performances 
The best and worst performances in each dance according to the judges' 40-point scale are as follows:

Couples' highest and lowest scoring dances

According to the traditional 40-point scale:

Weekly scores
Unless indicated otherwise, individual judges scores in the charts below (given in parentheses) are listed in this order from left to right: Andrzej Grabowski, Iwona Pavlović, Beata Tyszkiewicz and Michał Malitowski.

Week 1: Season Premiere
Running order

Week 2: Most Memorable Moments
Running order

Week 3: Latin Week
Running order

Week 4: My place on Earth
Running order

Week 5: Polish Friday
Running order

Week 6: Eras Week
The teams were chosen by the winner and runner-up couples in 5th episode – Ewelina & Tomasz and Łukasz & Agnieszka.
Running order

Week 7: My first time
Running order

Week 8: Halloween Night
Running order

Week 9: Radio Hits (Semi-final)
Running order

Dance-off

Running order

Week 10: Season Finale
Running order

Other Dances

Dance chart
The celebrities and professional partners danced one of these routines for each corresponding week:
Week 1 (Season Premiere): Cha-cha-cha, Waltz, Jive, Foxtrot
Week 2 (Most Memorable Moments): One unlearned dance (introducing Rumba, Viennese Waltz, Jazz) 
Week 3 (Latin Week): One unlearned dance (introducing Samba, Salsa, Argentine Tango)
Week 4 (My place on Earth): One unlearned dance (introducing Paso doble, Contemporary, Quickstep)
Week 5 (Polish Friday): One unlearned dance and Rock'n'Roll marathon
Week 6 (Eras Week): One unlearned dance and Team Freestyle (introducing Charleston, Hip-hop, Disco)
Week 7 (My first time): One unlearned dance and one repeated dance
Week 8 (Halloween Night/Trio Challenge): Cha-cha-cha duel, one repeated dance (trio dances) and Freestyle
Week 9 (Semi-final: Radio Hits): One unlearned dance, one repeated dance and dance-off (introducing Tango)
Week 10 (Season Finale): Judges' choice, Freestyle and couple's favorite dance of the season.

 Highest scoring dance
 Lowest scoring dance
 Performed, but not scored
 Not performed due to withdrawal
 Bonus points

Call-out order

 This couple came in first place with the judges.
 This couple came in last place with the judges.
 This couple came in last place with the judges and was eliminated.
 This couple was eliminated.
 This couple withdrew from the competition.
 This couple was saved from elimination by immunity.
 This couple won the competition.
 This couple came in second in the competition.
 This couple came in third in the competition.

Guest performances

Rating figures

References

External links
 

Season 17
2015 Polish television seasons